The 2014–15 season was the Manitoba Junior Hockey League's (MJHL) 98th season of operation.  

The Portage Terriers dominated the MJHL from start to finish this season, posting the best winning percentage in league history and going undefeated in the playoffs, to win their ninth Turnbull Cup.  After finishing second at the 2015 Western Canada Cup, the Terriers hosted the 2015 Royal Bank Cup in Portage la Prairie and became the first Manitoba team since 1974 to win the national Junior "A" championship.

Season highlights
The league eliminates the Addison and Sherwood Divisions and adopts a balanced 60-game schedule for each team.
Rule change: in accordance with Canadian Junior Hockey League (CJHL) guidelines, players penalized for fighting are assessed a game misconduct penalty.  This rule change is part of a multi-year initiative to reduce fighting in junior hockey.
Portage Terriers national championship season
Set MJHL record for highest single-season winning percentage.
Go undefeated in the MJHL playoffs to win the Turnbull Cup.
Host and win the 2015 Royal Bank Cup in Portage la Prairie, the first national Junior "A" champion from Manitoba since 1974. 
Head coach Blake Spiller is named CJHL Coach of the Year.

Standings

Playoffs

Post MJHL playoffs
Western Canada Cup
Portage Terriers finish second in the round robin; defeated by Penticton Vees 4-3 in championship game; defeat Melfort Mustangs 3-2 in runner-up game.
Royal Bank Cup
Portage Terriers (host team) finish first in the round robin; defeat Melfort Mustangs 6-1 in semi-final; defeat Carleton Place Canadians 5-2 in the final to win the national Junior 'A' championship.

League awards 
 Steve "Boomer" Hawrysh Award (MVP): Tristan Keck, Winkler
 MJHL Top Goaltender Award: Nick Deery, Steinbach
 Brian Kozak Award (Top Defenceman): Tanner Jago, Portage
 Vince Leah Trophy (Rookie of the Year): James Shearer, Steinbach
 Lorne Lyndon Memorial Trophy (Hockey Ability and Sportsmanship): Brad Bowles, Portage
 Muzz McPherson Award (Coach of the Year): Blake Spiller, Portage
 Mike Ridley Trophy (Scoring Champion): Zack Waldvogel, Portage
 MJHL Playoff MVP: Dane Schioler, Portage

CJHL awards 
 CJHL Player of the Year (MJHL): Tristan Keck, Winkler
CJHL Coach of the Year: Blake Spiller, Portage
CJHL Western All-star Team: Tanner Jago, Portage

References

External links
 MJHL Website
 2014-15 MJHL season at HockeyDB.com

Manitoba Junior Hockey League seasons
MJHL